Chris Avram (born Cristea Avram; August 31, 1931 – January 10, 1989) was a Romanian-Italian film actor.

Early life and career
Avram was born in Bucharest, into a family of active communists (his father being a member of the Romanian Communist Party while it was still banned, and his brother, Puiu, a Communist activist). In his youth, he attended a military school, after which he studied law for two years at the University of Bucharest, before being admitted to the Academy of Theatrical Arts and Cinematography. With her help, he managed to flee to Paris in 1966, where he remained. Later he settled in Rome, Italy, where he died of cancer.

He was married for a while to Romanian actress , with whom he had a son, Alexandru.

Partial filmography

Darclee (1959) - Eugenio Giraldoni
 (1960) - the engineer Preda
Poveste sentimentală (1960)
Anotimpuri (1963)
The White Moor (1965) - Spânul
 (1966) - Grig
 (1966) - Lut (as Cristea Avram)
Mamaia (1967) - Ștefan
Manon 70 (1968)
Le temps de vivre (1969) - Michel Casno
Delitto al circolo del tennis (1969) - Riccardo Dossi
Il sole nella pelle (1971) - Father
A Bay of Blood (1971) (aka Twitch of the Death Nerve) - Franco Ventura / Frank Ventura
W Django! (1971) - Capitano Gomez
Variety (1971) - Arturo Robles
I senza Dio (1972) - Sam, detto 'Minnesota Killer'
So Sweet, So Dead (1972) - Professor Casali
Holy God, Here Comes the Passatore! (1973) - Zambelli
Cuore (1973)
Number One (1973)
The Violent Professionals (1973) - DelBuono
Servo suo (1973)
I figli di nessuno (1974) - Anselmo Vannini
El amor empieza a medianoche (1974) - Andrés
The Killer Reserved Nine Seats (1974) - Patrick Davenant
Il giudice e la minorenne (1974) - Marco Serra
The Eerie Midnight Horror Show (1974) (aka The Sexorcist) - Mario
 (1975) - Marco / marito-husband
 (1976) - Prof. John
Emanuelle in Bangkok (1976) - Thomas Quizet
Stangata in famiglia (1976) - Esposito
La malavita attacca... la polizia risponde! (1977) - Prof. Salviati - 'll Principe'
California (1977) - Nelson
La profezia (1978) - Andrea
Il commissario Verrazzano (1978) - Marco Verelli
The Iron Commissioner (1978) - Crivelli
L'étrange monsieur Duvallier (1979, TV Series) - Della Pietra
Star Odyssey (1980) - Shawn
La ripetente fa l'occhietto al preside (1980) - Lino Pastorelli
Giochi erotici nella 3a galassia (1981) - Ceylon
 (1981)
Sogni mostruosamente proibiti (1982)
Vai avanti tu che mi vien da ridere (1982) - lo sceicco Abadjan
 (1983) - Il barone Mario di Villalba (final film role)

References

External links

1931 births
1989 deaths
Romanian male film actors
Italian male film actors
Romanian defectors
Romanian emigrants to Italy
Deaths from cancer in Lazio
20th-century Italian male actors
Caragiale National University of Theatre and Film alumni
Male actors from Bucharest